Ventrapragada is a village in Krishna district of the Indian state of Andhra Pradesh. It is the mandal headquarters of Pedaparupudi mandal in Gudivada revenue division.

References

Villages in Krishna district